Urbane Francis Bass (April 4, 1880 – October 6, 1918) was an African-American medical doctor and first lieutenant in the United States Army who was posthumously awarded the Distinguished Service Cross for his actions during the first World War.

Early life 
Bass was born on April 4, 1880, in Richmond, Virginia to Rosa and Richard J. Bass. His father was a salesman, alternating from shoes and clothing in the 1880s, to insurance in the 1900s. The couple had six children and lived on East Duval St. in Richmond.  While in school, Bass worked as a clerk. He graduated from Virginia Union University in 1902 and the Leonard Medical School of Shaw University in 1906. After leaving Leonard, Bass began a medical practice in Richmond but by 1909 had moved to Fredericksburg where he opened a larger practice and pharmacy on Amelia Street.  Bass became the first African American physician since the Reconstruction to reside in the city and his practice was well received by the African American community despite the lack of privileges given by the local hospital.  By 1916, Bass was married and father of four and was settled for some time in Hampton, Virginia.

Military career 
In 1916, Bass wrote to Secretary of War Newton Baker, offering his services as a doctor for the armed forces.  In the letter he dictated,

"I am herewith offering my services for the Army Medical Corps should there be need for a Negro Physicican for that branch of Service.

Dr. Urbane Bass
Fredericksberg Physician".

Bass received a commission as a First Lieutenant in the Medical Reserve Corps and reported for duty at Fort Des Moines on August 14, 1917. Fort Des Moines opened for training African-American men as there had been a huge influx of African-American volunteers and a petition was erected by the students of Howard University.  However, there was still some discontent at the facility as many soldiers found that he had been unfairly assessed for merely being black.  After receiving basic medical officer training, Bass was transferred to Camp Funston. On March 30, 1918, Bass departed from Newport News, Virginia for France aboard the USS Susquehanna, with the 372nd Infantry Regiment of the 93rd Infantry Division.

By September 1918, the 372nd and 369th Infantry was responsible for the defenses of Bellenvue Signal Ridge, and assisted the French legions in trying to fend off the German assaults coming from the trenches not far from them.  Most of Bass' work was done in the front lines in the various aid stations dealing with immediate injuries.

Death and legacy 
On October 6, 1918, Monthois, France was facing heavy artillery fire from the Germans leaving many wounded in the processes. Bass went into the line so he could provide immediate aid to the wounded when a shell blasted in the forward aid station he had been working in.  The explosion severed both of his legs around the thigh region.  With not many attendants around, Bass died in minutes from shock and blood loss.  He was posthumously awarded the Distinguished Service Cross on July 9, 1918, for administering "first aid in the open under prolonged and intense shell fire until he was severely wounded and carried from the field."

Bass' body was returned home and reburied in Fredericksburg National Cemetery on July 23, 1921, making him the first African-American officer to be interred there.  The Shiloh Baptist Church in Fredericksburg installed a large stained glass window incorporating Bass' image in honor of his heroism.  The American Medical Association acknowledged Dr. Bass's contributions and service in their 1919 issue.  In 1991, the Rebel Bowl Building in Fredericksburg was renamed the Bass-Ellison Social Services Building, in honor of Bass and his fellow Fredericksburg citizen Dr. Richard C. Ellison.

Personal life
Dr. Bass married Maude Vass and the couple had four children, three daughters and one son.  His son, Urbane Bass Jr. was born on February 10, 1910.  He became a physician and relocated his family to Los Angeles, California, after his family's house on Cairo, IL was bombed by opponents of school integration.  He died on March 5, 1996, and was buried in California. According to an article, Maude never remarried in the nearly 70 years she was a widow.  She lived to be 100 years old and was buried next to her husband in Officer's Row in Fredericksburg.

References

External links 

Recipients of the Distinguished Service Cross (United States)
Military personnel from Richmond, Virginia
Virginia Union University alumni
Shaw University alumni
1880 births
1918 deaths
United States Army Medical Corps officers
African Americans in World War I
20th-century African-American physicians
United States Army personnel of World War I
American military personnel killed in World War I
American amputees
Burials in Virginia
African-American United States Army personnel